Non-thermal microwave effects or specific microwave effects have been posited in order to explain unusual observations in microwave chemistry. The main effect of the absorption of microwaves by most materials is heating; the random motion of the constituent molecules is increased. Non-thermal effects are effects that are not due to the increase of thermal energy of the material. Instead, the microwave energy itself directly couples to energy modes within the molecule or lattice. Non-thermal effects in liquids are almost certainly non-existent, as the time for energy redistribution between molecules in a liquid is much less than the period of a microwave oscillation. A 2005 review has illustrated this in application to organic chemistry, though clearly supports the existence of non-thermal effects. It has been shown that such non-thermal effects exist in the reaction of  O + HCl(DCl) -> OH(OD) + Cl in the gas phase and the authors suggest that some mechanisms may also be present in the condensed phase. Non-thermal effects in solids are still part of an ongoing debate. It is likely that through focusing of electric fields at particle interfaces, microwaves cause plasma formation and enhance diffusion in solids via second-order effects. As a result, they may enhance solid-state sintering processes. Debates continued in 2006 about non-thermal effects of microwaves that have been reported in solid-state phase transitions. A 2013 essay concluded the effect did not exist in organic synthesis involving liquid phases. A 2015 perspective discusses the non-thermal microwave effect (a resonance process) in relation to selective heating by Debye relaxation processes.

References

Chemical kinetics
Microwave chemistry